The Vienna International Centre (VIC) is the campus and building complex hosting the United Nations Office at Vienna (UNOV; in ). It is colloquially also known as UNO City.

Overview
The VIC, designed by Austrian architect Johann Staber, was built between 1973 and 1979 just north of the river Danube.
The initial idea of setting up an international organization in Vienna came from the Chancellor of Austria Dr. Bruno Kreisky.

Six Y-shaped office towers surround a cylindrical conference building for a total floor area of 230,000 square metres. The highest tower ("A Building") stands 127 metres tall, enclosing 28 floors. These office towers were among the first modern skyscrapers to be built in Austria.

About 5,000 people work at the VIC, which also offers catering and shopping facilities (see Commissary below) and a post office (postal code 1400 Wien). Two banks (Bank Austria, Bawag PSK and United Nations Federal Credit Union offices), travel agents and other commercial services have offices on the premises.

The VIC is an extraterritorial area, exempt from the jurisdiction of local law.

Complementing the early 2000s asbestos removal works in the VIC, a new conference building, previously designated “C2”, now termed “M Building”, was constructed over the existing parking deck near the southern perimeter of the campus, and put into service in 2009.

The M building hosted all conferences during the renovation of the C building (previously the main conference facility) from 2009 to 2013.  Both M and C buildings are now being used for meetings.  Very large conferences can be accommodated in the neighbouring Austria Center Vienna (ACV), a separate conference and exhibition centre with a capacity of 6,000, which is with the VIC campus part of the UNO-City. The ACV has an indoor link to the VIC buildings. It is guarded by United Nations security personnel, since the VIC has exterritorial status; the ACV does not.

The VIC is served by Kaisermühlen/VIC station on line U1 of the Vienna U-Bahn (underground railway).

Organizations
A major UN site along with New York, Geneva and Nairobi, the VIC hosts several organizations:
 Preparatory Commission for the Comprehensive Nuclear-Test-Ban Treaty Organization (CTBTO; German: Organisation des Vertrags über das umfassende Verbot von Nuklearversuchen)
 International Atomic Energy Agency (IAEA; German: Internationale Atomenergieorganisation, IAEO)
 United Nations Commission on International Trade Law (UNCITRAL; German: Kommission der Vereinten Nationen für internationales Handelsrecht)
 United Nations Industrial Development Organization (UNIDO; German: Organisation der Vereinten Nationen für industrielle Entwicklung)
 United Nations Office on Drugs and Crime (UNODC; German: Büro der Vereinten Nationen für Drogen- und Verbrechensbekämpfung)
 United Nations High Commissioner for Refugees (UNHCR; German: Hoher Flüchtlingskommissar der Vereinten Nationen)
 United Nations Office for Outer Space Affairs (UNOOSA; German: Büro der Vereinten Nationen für Weltraumfragen)
 International Commission for the Protection of the Danube River (ICPDR; German: Internationale Kommission zum Schutz der Donau)

Five other notable international organizations headquartered in Vienna, the Organization for Security and Co-operation in Europe (OSCE), the Organization of Petroleum Exporting Countries (OPEC), the OPEC Fund for International Development (OFID), the International Anti-Corruption Academy (IACA) and the International Institute for Applied Systems Analysis (IIASA), occupy facilities outside the VIC.

Commissary
The Vienna International Centre offers shopping opportunities to its staff, and the staff of Permanent Missions and other international organizations based in Vienna. The Commissary, so named after similar facilities for U.S. military personnel at various duty stations, offers an international selection of foodstuffs and household items, thus catering to expatriate employees (and selected family members) who may purchase familiar items that are not readily available in the host country Austria. The store is run by the IAEA on a non-profit basis.

See also
Donau City

Notes
  The official name uses British spelling (Centre), following UN conventions.
  In contrast to the VIC, the ACV officially uses American spelling (Center).

References

External links 

 The United Nations in Vienna

Buildings and structures in Donaustadt
Buildings and structures completed in 1979
Skyscrapers in Vienna
Austria and the United Nations
Diplomatic buildings
United Nations properties
Skyscraper office buildings in Austria
1979 establishments in Austria
20th-century architecture in Austria